William Dabney may refer to:

 William C. Dabney (1894–1963), American industrialist
 William G. Dabney (1924–2018), African-American World War II soldier awarded the Legion of Honor
 William H. Dabney (1934–2012), American Vietnam War officer

See also
 Dabney (disambiguation)